Barry Michael Boughner (born January 29, 1948 in Delhi, Ontario) is a Canadian former professional ice hockey left winger. He played 20 National Hockey League games with the Oakland Seals/California Golden Seals between 1969 and 1971, going scoreless with 11 penalty minutes. He also played in the minor leagues, retiring in 1975.

Boughner served as head coach for the Niagara Falls Flyers of the Ontario Hockey Association for a portion of the 1979–80 season.

Career statistics

Regular season and playoffs

External links

1948 births
Albuquerque Six-Guns players
California Golden Seals players
Canadian ice hockey coaches
Canadian ice hockey left wingers
Des Moines Oak Leafs players
Ice hockey people from Ontario
Living people
London Nationals players
New Haven Nighthawks players
Niagara Falls Flyers coaches
Oakland Seals players
Sportspeople from Norfolk County, Ontario
Providence Reds players